K. P. Padhmanabha Menon, B.A, B.L, M.R.A.S (Member of Royal Asiatic Society, London) (1857-1919) was an Indian historian, lawyer, Judge of the Madras High Court and also the Advocate General of Madras. He was born at Elamakkara, near Edappally, in October 1857. He was the son of Diwan Peshkar P. Sankunny Menon who authored A History of Travancore, which was one of the first scholarly works on the history of Travancore. K. P. Padhmanabha Menon's History of Kerala in four volumes with 2,500 pages was completed in 1910. Padmanabha Menon used a portion of the Aluva Palace for this work. The work was published in 1924, five years after his death. K. P. Padhmanabha Menon also wrote Kochirajya Charitram, a history of the Kingdom of Cochin, in two volumes, published in 1912 and 1914 respectively. K. P. Padmanabha Menon introduced the method of social history and is regarded as the first modern historian of Kerala.

References

Historians of India
Historians of Kerala
1857 births
1919 deaths
Scholars from Kerala
Malayalam-language writers
Indian male writers
21st-century Indian historians
Writers from Kochi